Vangelis Koutsopoulos (born 2 February 1980) is a Greek former professional footballer.

Career
Koutsopoulos was born in Karditsa. He played for clubs including PAOK, Panionios, Atromitos, APOEL, and AEL Limassol.

He was a member of the PAOK squad that won the 2002–03 Greek Football Cup. That season he also scored in the UEFA Cup against Leixões in a 4–1 victory.

His brother is the goalkeeper Dimitrios Koutsopoulos.

References

External links
Guardian Football
Profile at Onsports.gr

1980 births
Living people
Greek footballers
Naoussa F.C. players
Anagennisi Karditsa F.C. players
Paniliakos F.C. players
Leonidio F.C. players
PAOK FC players
Panionios F.C. players
Atromitos F.C. players
APOEL FC players
AEL Limassol players
Levadiakos F.C. players
PAE Kerkyra players
Trikala F.C. players
Super League Greece players
Cypriot First Division players
Association football defenders
Greek expatriate footballers
Expatriate footballers in Cyprus
Greek expatriate sportspeople in Cyprus
Footballers from Karditsa